Ognevo is a rural locality (a village) in Botanovskoye Rural Settlement, Mezhdurechensky District, Vologda Oblast, Russia. The population was 15 as of 2002.

Geography 
Ognevo is located 37 km southwest of Shuyskoye (the district's administrative centre) by road. Yershovo is the nearest rural locality.

References 

Rural localities in Mezhdurechensky District, Vologda Oblast